Paul Gauguin Cruises is a cruise line that was owned by Beachcomber Croisieres Limited until 2019, when it was purchased by French company Compagnie du Ponant. Paul Gauguin Cruises operates cruises with one ship, the Paul Gauguin, to Tahiti, French Polynesia and the South Pacific.

The cruise line is named after the 19th century painter Paul Gauguin, who spent ten years living with and painting the people and nature of the Polynesia area.

History
The Paul Gauguin and Paul Gauguin Cruises had been operating under Regent Seven Seas Cruises from 1998–2010 until Pacific Beachcomber took over Paul Gauguin Cruises and its ship in January 2010. The parent company, Beachcomber Croisieres Limited, had previously acquired the cruise line in 2009. On September 30, 2011 the company announced the acquisition of a second ship. The ship was christened as Tere Moana in December 2012. In June 2015, the company announced the sale of the Tere Moana, leaving the Paul Gauguin as its only ship.

In 2019 the cruise line was purchased by Compagnie du Ponant. In late 2019, Ponant finalised a contract with Fincantieri's VARD yards to construct two hybrid vessels scheduled for delivery in 2022. The vessels will be of the same design as Ponant's current explorer class. However, they will feature batteries to support the ships' energy requirements during port visits and while visiting environmentally sensitive locations. The ships will have a gross tonnage of 11,000 and carry 230 passengers.

During the COVID-19 pandemic, the Paul Gauguin did not sail for some time but resumed operations on 18 July 2020 for local residents and on 29 July for international guests, with reduced occupancy.

Destination
Paul Gauguin currently sails year-round to Tahiti & Society Islands, Cook Islands, French Polynesia, Fiji, Marquesas, Tonga, Tuamotus, Australia & New Zealand. The Tere Moana had its final sailing as a Paul Gauguin Cruise on May 14, 2016.

Fleet

Current fleet

Future fleet

Previous fleet

References

External links
Official website

Companies based in Bellevue, Washington
Transport companies established in 1998
Cruise lines
Travel and holiday companies of the United States
Shipping companies of the United States